The 2015 Leeds International Piano Competition was the 18th edition of the tournament, and it was held in the University of Leeds and the Leeds Town Hall from 26 August to 13 September 2015, with the Hallé Orchestra acting in the final conducted by Mark Elder. Russian pianist Anna Tsybuleva won the competition.

Jury
  Fanny Waterman (chairman)
  Nikolai Demidenko
  Pascal Devoyon
  Danny Evans
  Adam Gatehouse
  Han Tong-il
  Jerome Lowenthal
  Robert McDonald
  Marios Papadopoulos
  Boris Petrushansky
  Anne Queffélec
  Eleanor Wong

Results

Reactions
Andrew Clements from The Guardian found that while Tcybuleva's playing in the final was fluent:

 "...she often seemed incapable of seeing the overall shape of the work [Brahms' 2nd Concerto], and her role in projecting it." 

Clements further commented that "only Petersen and Kim gave any sense that they chose music they genuinely loved" (Rachmaninov's 1st and Beethoven's 4th respectively), while describing Pisarenko as "another pianist with steely technique and limited musical imagination in the current Russian mould."

References

External links
 Official website

Leeds International Piano Competition
August 2015 events in the United Kingdom
September 2015 events in the United Kingdom
2010s in Leeds